Ishikawa Station can refer to two railway stations in Aomori Prefecture, Japan:

 Ishikawa Station (JR East)
 Ishikawa Station (Kōnan Railway)

See also
 In Aomori Prefecture
 Ishikawa-Poolmae Station
 In Fukushima Prefecture
 Iwaki-Ishikawa Station
 In Kanagawa Prefecture
 Ishikawachō Station
 In Tokyo
 Ishikawadai Station